Lana Del Rey is the eponymous second extended play by American singer-songwriter Lana Del Rey. It was released on January 10, 2012, in the United States and Canada through Interscope Records. After the release of the EP Kill Kill (2008) and her debut studio album Lana Del Ray (2010) via an independent label, the EP was released in anticipation of Del Rey's major label debut album Born to Die (2012). The tracks are influenced by several genres, including indie pop, hip hop, and alternative music. The lyrics and melody were written primarily by Del Rey, Justin Parker and Emile Haynie. Production of the album was led by Emile Haynie, who also co-wrote "Blue Jeans".

Music videos accompanied each single, which were produced by Del Rey herself and uploaded to YouTube. Although the video for "Video Games" that Del Rey filmed with her webcam was not intended as a single at the time, it garnered enough online buzz to be noticed by Stranger Records, leading to Del Rey signing a joint record deal with Interscope and Polydor Records.

Selling over 24,000 copies in the United States, the EP peaked at number 20 on the US Billboard 200, reaching number six on both the Billboard Rock Albums and Alternative Albums charts. All four songs on the EP were released as singles on Born to Die, with three charting internationally.

Music and lyrics

Del Rey used lower vocals on the EP, claiming "people weren't taking me very seriously, so I lowered my voice, believing that it would help me stand out. Now I sing quite low... well, for a female anyway." The singer's first singles, "Video Games" and "Born to Die" were described variously as "quasi-cabaret balladry", "woozy and sometimes soporific soundtrack soul", "pop", and "indie pop".

The third track, "Blue Jeans", was influenced by hip hop and has a minimalist beat that recalls songs by Timbaland. "Off to the Races" has been lyrically described as "a freak show of inappropriate co-dependency", with a chorus that recalls Sheryl Crow's "down and out drunken loner persona" in her 1994 single "Leaving Las Vegas". Pryia Elan of NME noted the track "almost falls under the weight of this persona. There's none of 'Video Games' measured, piano-led reflection. Instead the psychosexual rumblings of the lyrics and the dual voices she uses off set the comparatively simple musical shades on display."

Critical reception
John Bush of AllMusic considered the singer a femme fatale "with a smoky voice, a languorous image, and a modeling contract". However, Bush rated the EP 2.5 stars out of five, considering it only "as a teaser from the album".

Commercial performance
The EP entered the Billboard 200 on the chart issue of January 21, 2012, at number 20, after selling 14,000 digital copies. As of February 1, 2012, it has sold 24,000 digital copies in the United States.

Track listing

Charts

Release history

References

2012 EPs
Albums produced by Emile Haynie
Indie pop EPs
Interscope Records EPs
Lana Del Rey albums